Arquivo Edgard Leuenroth is a historical and media archive that is maintained by the Brazilian State University of Campinas (Universidade Estadual de Campinas—Unicamp), located in the city of Campinas in the state of São Paulo, Brazil. It was started by a donation of the media collection assembled by Brazilian anarchist journalist and publisher Edgard Leuenroth (1881–1968).

The Arquivo Edgard Leuenroth has the largest collection of materials regarding social movements, counterculture, and other alternative cultural movements in Brazil. This collection is, therefore, very much appreciated by researchers from all over the world, because it presents a non-official view and understanding of Brazil in the twentieth century. Among others, the Feminist Movement (or Movimento Feminista) and the Homosexual Movement (or Movimento Homossexual, in this case, the Grupo Gay da Bahia), are among the many collections being maintained by the Arquivo Edgard Leuenroth of the State University of Campinas.

The collection includes 280,000 documents, 28,000 books, 854 videos, 289 films, 1,419 audio recordings and 45,000 photographs.

See also
 List of archives in Brazil

References

Further reading

External links
 Arquivo Edgard Leuenroth 
 The Leila Miccolis Brazilian Alternative Press Collection. Official site of the University of Miami, accessed on April 26, 2006.
 Edgard Leuenroth page from the Anarchist Encyclopedia

Archives in Brazil
University of Campinas
Libraries in Brazil
Education in São Paulo (state)
Organisations based in São Paulo (state)